Hukumchand Patidar is an Indian farmer. In 2018, he has been awarded Padma Shri by the Indian Government for his contribution in organic farming.

Early life and education 
Patidar is from Manpura village. He is a class 10 dropout.

Career 
Patidar works on organic farming. He is a part of the Indian Council For Agricultural Research. He also a part of Indian Council for Agricultural Research.

Awards 

 Padma Shri in 2018

References 

Living people
Year of birth missing (living people)
Recipients of the Padma Shri
Indian farmers